Guitry Bananier (born 11 June 1951) is a French boxer. He competed in the men's lightweight event at the 1972 Summer Olympics. At the 1972 Summer Olympics, he defeated Luis Davila of Puerto Rico, before losing to Kim Tae-ho of South Korea.

References

1951 births
Living people
Lightweight boxers
French male boxers
Olympic boxers of France
Boxers at the 1972 Summer Olympics
Place of birth missing (living people)